Most Serene Republic
() is a title attached to a number of European states through history. By custom, the appellation "Most Serene" is an indicator of sovereignty (see also Serene Highness or Most Serene Highness for a sovereign prince). When used in the past, the title "Most Serene Republic" emphasized the sovereignty of the republic.

Modern states 
Currently, no country officially calls itself a "Most Serene Republic". San Marino, officially "the Republic of San Marino", is the only modern independent nation still sometimes referred to by the style, being at times unofficially called the Most Serene Republic of San Marino.

Historical states 
 Republic of Venice, a city-state that existed from 697 to 1797 based in the city of Venice with continuously controlled territory along the eastern Adriatic and Greece at its strongest period. The phrase "La Serenissima" ("The Most Serene") was also popularly used as a specific reference to the Venetian government or state authorities.
 Republic of Genoa, an independent state based in present-day Liguria on the northwestern Italian coast from ca. 1100 to 1805. After using the plain title of "Republic" for a long time, the honorific "Most Serene" was added after the election of the first Doge of Genoa (1339). Even so, to distinguish their government from its ancient rival to the east, the Genoese rarely used the "Most Serene" designation, opting more frequently for the appellation "Superb Republic", a nickname allegedly coined by Petrarch in 1358.
 Republic of Lucca, a city-state that existed from 1119 to 1799 based in the city of Lucca, in northern Tuscany, Italy. Lucca was the third largest Italian city state (after Venice and Genoa) with a republican constitution ("comune") to remain independent over the centuries.
 Polish–Lithuanian Commonwealth, an elective monarchy in Central and Eastern Europe, existing from 1569 until 1795.

See also 
 Serene Highness

References 

History of Europe
Former republics
Superlatives